Charles Hill (15 August 1886 – 15 April 1961) was a British cyclist. He competed in two events at the 1912 Summer Olympics.

References

External links
 

1886 births
1961 deaths
British male cyclists
Olympic cyclists of Great Britain
Cyclists at the 1912 Summer Olympics
Sportspeople from Edinburgh